K'isi K'isini (Aymara and Quechua expression, k'isi a stipa variety, the reduplication signifies there is a group or complex of something, the Aymara suffix -ni indicates ownership,  "the one with a group of stipa", Hispanicized spelling Quisi Quisini) is a  mountain in the  Cordillera Occidental in the Andes of Bolivia. It is located in the Oruro Department, Sajama Province, Curahuara de Carangas Municipality, Sajama Canton. K'isi K'isini is situated inside the boundaries of the Sajama National Park, south-east of the Parina Quta and Pomerape volcanoes and north of the Bolivian route 4 that leads to the Chungara–Tambo Quemado mountain pass on the border with Chile.

See also
 Acotango
 Lake Chungara
 Sajama
 Wallatiri
List of mountains in the Andes

References

External links 
 Curahuara de Carangas Municipality: population data and map

K'isi K'isini